(Pashto زوراور) is a Pashto language name . "Zor" means strength and "Zorawar" means strong .
 
In English "Zorawar" 

In Pashto this name can be used for male as "Zorawar" and for female "Zorawara"  both girls and boys can have the this name.

Famous bearers 
Zorawar Chand Bakhshi, Indian Army's most decorated general
Zorawar Kalra, Indian restaurateur
Zorawar Singh, third son of Guru Gobind Singh
Zorawar Singh Kahluria, general of the Sikh Empire

Indian given names
Hindu given names